Central Hastings School (CHS) is a K-12 school located in Madoc, Ontario in Hastings County serving 800+ students from across Centre Hastings. They offer Specialized High Skills Major which is a specialized high school diploma where students focus their secondary school education around the construction sector. 

The school was formerly Centre Hastings Secondary School. An accommodation review of schools in the area during 2016-2017 resulted in a Board decision to close Madoc Public School and consolidate it with Centre Hastings Secondary School as a K-12 school on the Centre Hastings site. The HPEDSB received $5.8 million in Ministry of Education funding in 2018, along with an additional $2.7 million in April 2020, to consolidate Madoc Public School and Centre Hastings Secondary School to create a K-12 school.

CHS has established itself as a community leader hosting dance recitals from the nearby Madoc School of Dance Arts and giving space to the elearnnetwork.ca to set up a centre inside the school.

Some of the features offered at CHSS:
 6 computer labs
 Transportation, construction and manufacturing facilities 
 Music rooms
 Drama room
 Fitness facility 
 Double gym, single gym and playing field
 playground including swing set

See also
List of high schools in Ontario

References

External links 
 CHSS Website
 School Profile
 Hastings and Princed Edward District School Board
 County of Hastings
 elearnnetwork.ca Hastings County located in CHSS

High schools in Hastings County
Educational institutions in Canada with year of establishment missing